Arsen Ninotsmindeli (died 1082) was a Georgian bishop, scholar, monk, translator and famous calligrapher of the 11th century. He is a saint of the Georgian Orthodox Church.

Arsen became a monk in Jerusalem. He was active at the Otkhta monastery of Tao-Klarjeti. After learning about him John the Iberian and Euthymius of Athos invited Arsen to the Georgian Iviron monastery of Mount Athos.

Arsen died on Mount Athos. He was buried next to Euthymius by George the Hagiorite.

References
Machitadze Zachary, Bukia Manana, Bulia Maka, "Lives of the Georgian Saints", Tbilisi, 2004
Mtatsmindeli Giorgi, "Life of John and Euthymius", Old Georgian hagiography and literature, Abuladze edition II, Tbilisi, 1967, p. 85
Giorgi Mtsire, "Life of Giorgi Mtatsmindeli, Tbilisi, 1967, p. 133
Menabde, L. "Old Georgian writing centers", Tbilisi, 1980, v. 2
Gabidzashvili, E. "Encyclopedia and the dictionary of the Georgian Orthodox Church", Tbilisi, 2007

Calligraphers from Georgia (country)
Translators from Georgia (country)
1082 deaths
Saints of Georgia (country)
Athonite Fathers
Year of birth missing
People associated with Iviron Monastery